Mike van der Kooy (born 30 January 1989) is a Dutch former professional footballer who played as a defender, preferably as a centre back.

Club career
Van der Kooy began his career playing for various youth teams. In 2007, he moved to FC Utrecht. He made his debut victory against Willem II Tilburg in Eredivisie on 3 February 2008, by a score of 2–0. He soon signed a professional contract until 2011 with FC Utrecht. Van der Kooy eventually played five league games for the club. 

On 2 August 2010, he signed a two-year contract with AGOVV. When his contract expired in 2012, his professional career came to an end, but he continued in the lower leagues from July 2012 to July 2015 for Hoofdklasse club DOVO. From July 2015 to July 2017, Van der Kooy played for SC Genemuiden in the Hoofdklasse. From September 2017, Van der Kooy played briefly with Eerste Klasse team DHSC from his hometown, but he decided to retire after a serious knee injury.

International career
Van der Kooy played for the Netherlands at under-15, under-16 and under-17 level. As part of the U17s, he participated in the 2005 FIFA U-17 World Championship in Peru, where the Netherlands finished in third place.

References

External links

1989 births
Living people
Dutch footballers
Netherlands youth international footballers
FC Utrecht players
TOP Oss players
AGOVV Apeldoorn players
VV DOVO players
DHSC players
Eredivisie players
Eerste Divisie players
Vierde Divisie players
Footballers from Utrecht (city)
Association football defenders
SC Genemuiden players